V. Karthesan was an Indian politician and former Member of the Legislative Assembly. He was elected to the Tamil Nadu legislative assembly as a Dravida Munnetra Kazhagam candidate from the Radhapuram constituency in the  1971 election.

References

Year of birth missing (living people)
Place of birth missing (living people)
Living people
Dravida Munnetra Kazhagam politicians
Missing middle or first names